The Japan national korfball team is managed by Japan Korfball Association (JKA), representing Japan in korfball international competitions.

Tournament history

References 

 

National korfball teams
Korfball
National team